Constituency NA-145 may refer to:

 NA-145 (Pakpattan-I), a new constituency after 2018 delimitation that covers the entire Pakpattan
 NA-145 (Okara-III), a former constituency based on 2002 delimitation

National Assembly Constituencies of Pakistan